The Rolfson House near Livingston, Montana was built in 1900.  It was listed on the National Register of Historic Places in 1979.

It is a tall one-and-a-half-story stone house, built by stonemason Martin Rolfson.

References

Houses on the National Register of Historic Places in Montana
Houses completed in 1900
National Register of Historic Places in Park County, Montana
1900 establishments in Montana
Stone houses in the United States